The War of the Montferrat Succession (Italian: Guerra di successione del Monferrato) was a war of succession from 1613 to 1617 over the Duchy of Montferrat in northwestern Italy.

The direct cause of the conflict was the death of duke Francesco IV Gonzaga of Montferrat and Mantua on 22 December 1612 without male heirs. His brother Ferdinando Gonzaga was a cardinal, but renounced his ecclesiastical career in order to succeed his brother in both the Duchy of Mantua and the Duchy of Montferrat. However, Francesco's wife Margaret of Savoy was the daughter of duke Charles Emmanuel I of Savoy, who claimed Montferrat now fell to his dynasty. Charles Emmanuel invoked the treaty of 1 May 1330 on the occasion of the marriage of Yolande Palaeologina of Montferrat, daughter of Theodore I, Marquess of Montferrat,  and Argentine Spinola, with Aymon, Count of Savoy. The treaty stipulated that when the male descendants of the marquis of Montferrat went extinct, those of Yolande (and thus the House of Savoy) would succeed in the marquisate, to provide the daughters with money.

Both sides rallied numerous other states to their camps, and the war raged on for four years. Spain and France joined Ferdinando's side, but France would defect to Charles Emmanuel's side in 1615. That year, the Peace of Asti was drawn up, determining that Savoy should relinquish its claims on Montferrat, but the treaty was never signed and the war continued. Eventually, Savoy and Spain finally signed the Peace of Asti in 1617, which confirmed Ferdinando as the legitimate heir of Francesco.

When Ferdinando died in 1626, his brother Vincenzo II (1594–1627), also a cardinal, succeeded him as Duke of Mantua and Montferrat. Despite marrying, following the resignation of Ferdinando and the expulsion of Vincenzo from the Sacred College of Cardinals (for violating the celibacy), neither produced any legitimate children. A new crisis erupted when Vincenzo II died on 26 December 1627, leading to the War of the Mantuan Succession (1627–1632).

Battles 
Siege of Alba (22 April 1613)
Siege of Trin (26 April 1613)
Siege of Moncalve (23 April – 8 May 1613)
Siege of Nizza Monferrato (14 – 23 May 1613)

References 

Monferrato
Monterrato